The 2012–13 1. FC Union Berlin season is the 107th season in the club's football history. In 2012–13 the club plays in the 2. Fußball-Bundesliga, the second tier of German football. It is the clubs fourth consecutive season in this league, having played at this level since 2009–10, after it was promoted from the 3. Liga in 2009.

The club also takes part in the 2012–13 edition of the DFB-Pokal, the German Cup, where it reached the second round and will face third division side Kickers Offenbach next.

Friendly matches

Competitions

2.Bundesliga

League table

Matches

DFB Pokal

Notes

References

External links
 2012–13 1. FC Union Berlin season at Weltfussball.de 
 2012–13 1. FC Union Berlin season at kicker.de 
 2012–13 1. FC Union Berlin season at Fussballdaten.de 

Union Berlin
1. FC Union Berlin seasons